Tweetbiz Insiders formerly as Tweetbiz: The Bizniz of Chizmiz is a Philippine television talk show broadcast by Q and GMA News TV. Hosted by Tim Yap, Lolit Solis and Gelli de Belen, it premiered on December 7, 2009. The show concluded on June 3, 2011. On February 28, 2011, the show premiered as Tweetbiz Insiders on GMA News TV.

The TV show is about having celebrity gossips and that gossip will be posted at the Tweetbiz section of GMA News Online. Every day there will be a Tweetmoso-in-Chief in charge of the showbiz gossips to be posted.

Cast
Tim Yap
Lolit Solis
Gelli de Belen
Justine Ferrer
Danzen Santos
Gorgy Rula 
Ronnie Carrasco
Fabio Ide
Chariz Solomon
Sam YG
Mr. Fu
Shalala
Maxene Magalona
Sebastian 
Suzuki Sadatsugu
Myster E

References

2009 Philippine television series debuts
2011 Philippine television series endings
GMA Integrated News and Public Affairs shows
GMA News TV original programming
Q (TV network) original programming